Rogers Lake is a lake in Dakota County, in the U.S. state of Minnesota.

Rogers Lake was named for E. G. Rogers, a pioneer farmer who settled there.

Wagon Wheel Trail divides the two sections of the lake (the northern is sometimes referred to as "Mendakota Lake") which are connected by a culvert (a popular fishing spot). The south shore is occupied by Saint Thomas Academy and the Patterson Companies headquarters. Interstate 35E is routed along the western shore. A paved trail runs between 35E and the lake, from Mendota Heights Road to Rogers Lake Parm. The park is located on the northwest corner of the lower lake, and is a popular area for fishing and skateboarding in the summer. Mendakota Country Club surrounds the northern section. The remainder of the shoreline is occupied by private homes and accompanying land.

See also
List of lakes in Minnesota

References

Lakes of Minnesota
Lakes of Dakota County, Minnesota